Jasmila Žbanić (born 19 December 1974) is a Bosnian film director, screenwriter and producer, best known for having written and directed Quo Vadis, Aida? (2020), which earned her nominations for the Academy Award for Best Foreign Language Film, the BAFTA Award for Best Film Not in the English Language, and the BAFTA Award for Best Direction.

Early life 
Žbanić was born in Sarajevo on 19 December 1974 into a Muslim family. Žbanić went to local schools before attending the Academy of Performing Arts in Sarajevo, where she got a degree. She worked for a time in the United States as a puppeteer in the Vermont-based Bread and Puppet Theater and as a clown in a Lee De Long workshop. In 1997, she founded the artist's association "Deblokada" and started making documentaries and short films.

Career
Žbanić went to the United States in order to work as a puppeteer in the Vermont-based Bread and Puppet Theater. She also learned to act as a clown in a Lee De Long workshop.

After her return to Bosnia and Herzegovina, she founded the artists' association "Deblokada" (meaning "de-blocking.") Through Deblokada, Žbanić wrote and produced many documentaries, video artworks, and short films. Her work has been seen around the globe, screened in film festivals and shown at exhibitions such as the Manifesta 3 in Slovenia in 2000, the Kunsthalle Fridericianum in Kassel in 2004, and the Istanbul Biennale in 2003. Since then she has made well-received feature films.

Žbanić's 2006 feature film Grbavica, won the Golden Bear at the 56th Berlin International Film Festival, the Grand Jury Prize at the International Feature Competition Festival in 2006, and was awarded the Best European Film and best European actress award in 2006. Her 2010 film Na putu (On the Path), which explores the relationship of a young couple living in Sarajevo, was screened at the 60th Berlin International Film Festival. 

Žbanić's 2020 war drama film Quo Vadis, Aida? won the Audience Award at the 50th International Film Festival Rotterdam, the Best International Film Award at the 2021 Gothenburg Film Festival, entered into the 77th Venice International Film Festival and also won the Best International Film Award at the 36th Independent Spirit Awards. Further more, in March 2021, the film was nominated for Best Film Not in the English Language and Žbanić was nominated for Best Director at the 74th British Academy Film Awards.  On 15 March 2021, Žbanić's film was nominated for Best International Feature Film at the 93rd Academy Awards. At the 34th European Film Awards held in December 2021, Quo Vadis, Aida? won the Award for Best Film. Also, Žbanić won the Award for Best Director and cast member Jasna Đuričić won the Award for Best Actress at the same awards.

Themes and characters
Žbanić acknowledges that her films deal chiefly with the people of Bosnia and Herzegovina. She says that she uses film to explore problems and issues relating to her life. Žbanić strives to create characters that are not just "black and white," as real people are not that simple. She does not create characters who are strict saints and heroes, but who might be weak and also  brave and tolerant. In 2017, Žbanić signed the Declaration on the Common Language of the Croats, Serbs, Bosniaks and Montenegrins.

Filmography

Film

Television

Awards

References

External links

2004 Interview with Žbanić 

1974 births
Living people
Film people from Sarajevo
Writers from Sarajevo 
Bosniaks of Bosnia and Herzegovina
Bosnia and Herzegovina women film directors
Bosnia and Herzegovina film directors
Bosnia and Herzegovina screenwriters
Women screenwriters
20th-century screenwriters
20th-century Bosnia and Herzegovina writers
20th-century Bosnia and Herzegovina women writers
21st-century screenwriters
21st-century Bosnia and Herzegovina writers
21st-century Bosnia and Herzegovina women writers
Directors of Golden Bear winners
European Film Award for Best Director winners
Signatories of the Declaration on the Common Language